Hoplocorypha macra is a species of praying mantis found in Angola, Kenya, Namibia, South Africa (Cape Province, Natal, Transvaal), Tanzania, Uganda, and Zambia.

See also
List of mantis genera and species

References

Hoplocorypha
Mantodea of Africa